Events in the year 1683 in Japan.

Incumbents
Monarch: Reigen

Events
January 25 - Yaoya Oshichi sets fire to her home in the hopes of being able to meet a young priest with whom she fell in love while seeking shelter from a previous fire. The fire destroyed a large section of Edo (present day Tokyo). Oshichi was later caught and punished for her crime by being burned at the stake. (Traditional Japanese Date: Twenty-eighth Day of the Twelfth Month, 1682)

References

 
1680s in Japan
Japan
Years of the 17th century in Japan